Agapanthia coeruleipennis is a species of beetle in the family Cerambycidae. It was described by Janos Frivaldszky in 1878. It is distributed in Turkey, Iran and Syria.

References

coeruleipennis
Beetles described in 1878